Čebovce is a village in the Veľký Krtíš District of the Banská Bystrica Region of southern Slovakia.

History
This Hungarian village was first mentioned in 1240 (as Chab). Prior to the Mongol invasion of Hungary of 1241-42, the village was known as Györgymártonfalva, which was destroyed in the Mongol-Tatar invasion. The original surviving inhabitants moved further down the valley. Local legend states that the most common name in the village 'Balga' (meaning 'foolish' in Hungarian) originates from the original local populace feeling 'foolish' for being seduced from giving up the original, well naturally fortified hill-village of Györgymártonfalva for the beautiful valley of Csáb, however this is only local myth. (Csábítás meaning seduced in Hungarian.)

The first Zichy Count and Habsburg Hungary general, Zichy István's mother was from Csáb; Csábi Sara.

It belonged to Zichy, Balassa and Somogyi noble families. After World War I, in the Peace Treaties of 1920 it was given to the newly formed Czechoslovakia. From 1938 to 1944 it returned to Hungary but the Paris Peace Treaties in 1946 gave it to Czechoslovakia, again.

Geography
The municipality lies at an altitude of 225 metres and covers an area of 16.21 km2. It has a population of 1,063 people.

Demographics 
Historically a near whole majority ethnic Hungarian village, the census data shows the following:

In 1880 had a population of 575; 499 (86.8%) Hungarians, 43 (7.5%) Slovaks, 6 (1%) Germans and 27 (4.7%) other ethnics.

In 1910 had a population of 774; 762 (98.4%) Hungarians and 12 (1.6%) Slovaks.

In 1921 had a population of 769; 704 (91.5%) Hungarians, 58 (7.5%) Slovaks and 7 (0.9%) others.

Modern census data since 1991 is available online, which have resulted in the following.

In 1991 had a population of 1,100; 874 (79.5%) Hungarians, 222 (20.1%) Slovaks, 1 Czech and 3 unknown.

In 2001 had a population of 1,056; 760 (72%) Hungarians, 285 (27%) Slovaks, 2 Czechs and 9 unknown.

In 2011 had a population of 1,063; 704 (66.2%) Hungarians, 306 (28.8%) Slovaks, 9 (0.8%) Gypsies, 1 Czech, 4 others and 39 unknown.

In 2021 had population of 1,044; 578 (55.4%) Hungarians, 447 (42.8%) Slovaks, 1 Gypsy, (<0.01%), 3 Germans (<0.01%), 2 others and 13 unknowns.

Genealogical resources

The records for genealogical research are available at the state archive "Statny Archiv in Banska Bystrica, Slovakia"

 Roman Catholic church records (births/marriages/deaths): 1755-1890 (parish A)

See also
 List of municipalities and towns in Slovakia

References

External links
http://www.e-obce.sk/obec/cebovce/cebovce.html
Surnames of living people in Cebovce

Villages and municipalities in Veľký Krtíš District